Françoise Briquel-Chatonnet (born 1956) is a French historian and research director. She is a doctor in history, research director at the CNRS, at the Orient and Mediterranean laboratory and a member of the Académie des inscriptions et belles-lettres. In 2016, she was awarded the Irène-Joliot-Curie Prize for Woman Scientist of the Year.

Biography 
Françoise Briquel-Chatonnet, was born on 22 August 1956 in Lyon, France. From 1975-1980, she attended the Ecole Normale Supérieure for young girls, and earned her Agrégation in history in 1978. She completed her doctorate from the University Panthéon-Sorbonne with a thesis on relations between cities of the Phoenician Coast and the Kingdoms of Israel and Judah (1988) and qualified to direct research from the François-Rabelais University in Tours (1999).

Career 
She was a resident at the National Library of France, Oriental Manuscripts Division (1981-1985), where she notably worked on the first volume of the catalog of Syriac manuscripts. In 2020, she became director of research at the CNRS (“Semitic Worlds” component) and deputy director of the “Orient and Mediterranean” laboratory (UMR 8167).

In 2016 she received the Irène-Joliot-Curie Prize for Woman Scientist of the Year for 'her research on the history of the Levant in the 1st millennium BC and the culture of Christians in the Near East, particularly through written objects, manuscripts and inscriptions."

She was elected a member of the French Academy of Inscriptions and Belles-Lettres on 21 May 2021.

Memberships 
At CNRS, Briquel-Chatonnet has served as a member of the CNRS national committee, section 32, (2004-2008) and of the scientific council of the Institute of Human and Social Sciences of the CNRS (2010-2014). She is also on the school's scientific council for Ecole Pratique des Hautes Etudes (2018-2021).

Briquel-Chatonnet is founder and President of the Society for Syriac Studies (Paris); member of the Asian Society (Paris), member of the Society for the Study of the Prehistoric, member of Ancient and Medieval Maghreb (Paris), member of the Society of Professors of Ancient History.

Personal life 
Briquel-Chatonnet married philologist and etruscologist Dominique Briquel.

Distinctions 
 Prize from the Thiers Foundation for the publication of her doctoral thesis, 1988
 CNRS bronze medal, 1993
 Irène-Joliot-Curie Prize for Woman Scientist of the Year, 2016
 Member of the Académie des inscriptions et belles-lettres since 2021
 Knight of the National Order of Merit
 Knight of the Academic Palms

Selected publications 
 Françoise Briquel-Chatonnet, The Syriac World , Paris, Les Belles Lettres, 2017, 272 p.
 Relations between the cities of the Phoenician coast and the kingdoms of Israel and Judah, Studia Phœnicia 12, Orientalia Lovaniensia Analecta 46, Louvain, Librairie orientaliste Peeters, 1992, 446 p.
 Syriac Manuscripts. National Library of France (manuscripts entered since 1911, no.356-435). Aix-en-Provence, Méjanes Library. Lyon, Municipal Library. Strasbourg, National and University Library. Catalog, Paris, National Library of France, 1997, 264 p.
 with Éric Gubel, Les Phéniciens : Aux origines du Liban, Gallimard, collection « Découvertes Gallimard / Archéologie » (nº 358), 1998, 160 p.
 with Pierre Bordreuil, Le Temps de la Bible, Paris, Gallimard, coll. “History Folio”, 2003, 461 p.
 Editing of the collective work La Bible, Paris, Jules Tallandier, 2003, 345 p.
 The Arameans and the first Arabs, Aix-en-Provence, Édisud, 2005 (Encyclopedia of the Mediterranean)
 Christian Arabia (with Christian Julien Robin), Paris, Les Belles Lettres, 2017

References

External links 
 RadioFrance Interview: The Arameans, with Françoise Briquel-Chatonnet (in French)
 RadioFrance Interview: The Language of Paradise, with Françoise Briquel-Chatonnet (in French)

Living people
1956 births
Scientists from Lyon
Research directors of the French National Centre for Scientific Research
French National Centre for Scientific Research scientists
21st-century French women scientists
20th-century French women scientists
20th-century French scientists
21st-century French scientists
Phoenician-Punic studies